Krabi International Airport (is an international airport serving Krabi, Thailand. The airport opened in 1999. In 2017, the airport handled over 4.3 million passengers. The terminal is designed for three million passengers, a number that has already been exceeded, and expansion will push its capacity to over 8 million.

Airport operations

On 10 February 2016 the Krabi Airport terminal was plunged into darkness for over six hours (09:00–15:30) due to an electrical power outage. The Provincial Electricity Authority (PEA) had notified Krabi Airport two days in advance that it would shut down power in the area for maintenance. Airport authorities activated back-up generators, but they did not work. Krabi's airport director stated after the event that management will rent generators in the future to prevent blackouts from happening. With no power for their computers, immigration officials were unable to access immigration databases and were forced to write down details of 2,000 passengers for later vetting. The deputy national police chief in charge of security, Pol Col Srivara Ransibrahmanakul, assured the public that a follow-up check showed that no blacklisted people were allowed into the country during the incident.

Expansion
In 2018, the airport was allocated 6.6 billion baht to build a third terminal, renovate the existing two terminals and car park, and expand aircraft parking bays and associated electrical power infrastructure. In 2019, the Department of Airports announced a project to double the airport's capacity to eight million passengers per year. The airport will no longer be expanded after its final phase of expansion due to lack of space and the city's expansion, and will not be able to cope with the future traffic. So, a new international airport is proposed to be built in Phang Nga province, which is expected to be completed by 2025, and will serve as an alternative to Krabi airport.

Airlines and destinations

Statistics

See also
 List of airports in Thailand
 Phang-Nga–Andaman International Airport

References

External links

 Official website

Airports in Thailand
Buildings and structures in Krabi province
Airports established in 1999
1999 establishments in Thailand